Jaime Iván Kaviedes Llorenty (born 24 October 1977) is an Ecuadorian former professional footballer who played as a forward.

Club career
Kaviedes rose to fame after scoring 43 goals in one season for Emelec in the 1998 Ecuadorian league. This led to a move to Perugia in the Italian Serie A. Kaviedes was unsuccessful there, since then he has journeyed around the world playing for a number of clubs in Europe, Mexico, and South America, even returning to his homeland.

After a brief spell in Deportivo Quito, Kaviedes signed with Premier League club Crystal Palace, and became the third Ecuadorian to play in the Premier League. He arrived at the club for a reported fee of reputedly £2 million, though there was confusion over whether he was signed on loan or on a full transfer. However, Kaviedes did not fit into Crystal Palace or with Manager Iain Dowie's 4–5–1 formation. He was transferred out of the club in the 2004–05 winter transfer window.

After the 2006 FIFA World Cup he transferred from Argentinos Juniors in Argentina for El Nacional in his homeland, 2006 Ecuadorian League Champions. In his first official game for the club, he scored an impressive four goals. He scored 14 goals in 2007. Kaviedes was transferred to LDU Quito for the 2008 season. After two games and one goal for the club, Kaviedes had a row with the directors of the Quito club and did not make an appearance for them for the rest of 2008. In 2009, he began to train again with LDU Portoviejo, but never signed with the club. At the end of 2009, Kaviedes was in a rehabilitation clinic for a couple of months. Because of unsportsmanlike conduct, Macara cancelled his contract and Kaviedes was searching for a club in Turkey or Lebanon.

In 2010, almost two years after last playing as a professional, he was signed by Macará of Ambato. In his third game for the club on 28 February against Universidad Católica, Kaviedes scored his first professional goal in 743 days. By the end of the day, he scored a hat-trick to give Macará their first win of the season.

International career
Due to his rise in worldwide prominence in the late 1990s, Kaviedes was given his Ecuador national team debut in a 2002 FIFA World Cup qualifier against Brazil in 1998.

Kaviedes scored in Ecuador's 1–1 draw with Uruguay in 2001 during the 2002 FIFA World Cup qualifiers, which allowed Ecuador to qualify for the first time ever to a FIFA World Cup.

He was part of the Ecuador national team that played at the 2002 and 2006 FIFA World Cups. He inherited the number 10 shirt for Ecuador after Alex Aguinaga's retirement, although it has been worn by Felipe Caicedo among a few others.

Kaviedes played for Ecuador during the 2006 World Cup, defeating Poland 2–0 in the opening match, and Costa Rica 3–0. It was in this game that El Nine (his nickname) scored his first World Cup goal, from a cross by Edison Mendez. Kaviedes' celebration involved donning a yellow Spider-Man mask and raising his arms – mimicking his late team-mate Otilino Tenorio's trademark goal celebration, who was killed in a car crash in 2005. "Otilino is accompanying us from heaven," Kaviedes later said. That goal helped Ecuador qualify to the second round alongside host Germany in Group A. As of 2008 he also has scored two goals in the qualifying campaign for his country.

Kaviedes also represented his country at Copa América 1999.

Style of play
Kaviedes was known as a striker with good touch, vision, passing range and a keen eye for goal. While not particularly strong in the air, Kaviedes has scored spectacular overhead goals in his career. He scored a goal with a bicycle kick with his back turned against FC Barcelona while playing for Real Valladolid. This goal was voted goal of the year.

Personal life
Kaviedes is of Greek and Italian descent.

References

External links

Kaviedes' FEF Player Card 

Iván Kaviedes Official Website
Profile at FIFA World Cup Official Website
TIME magazine article "Marvel Unmasked

1977 births
Living people
People from Santo Domingo de los Colorados
Greek people of Ecuadorian descent
Sportspeople of Ecuadorian descent
Ecuadorian people of Italian descent
Ecuadorian footballers
Ecuador international footballers
Ecuadorian expatriate sportspeople in England
Ecuadorian expatriate sportspeople in Spain
1999 Copa América players
2002 FIFA World Cup players
2006 FIFA World Cup players
Ecuadorian expatriate footballers
Expatriate footballers in Argentina
Expatriate footballers in England
Expatriate footballers in Italy
Expatriate footballers in Portugal
Expatriate footballers in Spain
Ecuadorian Serie A players
Serie A players
La Liga players
Premier League players
Argentine Primera División players
C.S. Emelec footballers
A.C. Perugia Calcio players
RC Celta de Vigo players
Club Puebla players
Real Valladolid players
FC Porto players
Barcelona S.C. footballers
S.D. Quito footballers
Crystal Palace F.C. players
Argentinos Juniors footballers
C.D. El Nacional footballers
L.D.U. Quito footballers
C.S.D. Macará footballers
S.D. Aucas footballers
L.D.U. Loja footballers
L.D.U. Portoviejo footballers
Association football forwards